Plymouth County is a county located in the U.S. state of Iowa. As of the 2020 census, the population was 25,698. The county seat is Le Mars. Plymouth County was named after Plymouth, Massachusetts.

Plymouth County is part of the Sioux City, IA-NE-SD Metropolitan Statistical Area.

History
Plymouth County was formed on January 15, 1851. Settlement began in the county in 1856. In October 1859, the first courthouse was built in Melbourne, formerly located in the southeast quarter of section 34, Plymouth Township, about five to six miles due south of Merrill. The first public school opened its doors there with 32 pupils. In 1872 the county seat was moved to Le Mars and a courthouse and jail were built there in 1873. The present Plymouth County Courthouse was built in 1900 of red sandstone.

During the Great Depression, farmers in the county organized the Farmers Holiday Group, to keep farm products off the market until the desired price was met. A radical group among them abducted Judge Bradley from his court chamber and threatened to hang him in the front of the courthouse. Bradley was freed, but the governor ordered the national guard to Plymouth County and declared a state of emergency, which effectively ended the group.

Geography
It is the fourth-largest county by area in Iowa.

Adjacent counties
 Sioux County  (north)
 Cherokee County  (east)
 Woodbury County  (south)
 Union County, South Dakota  (west)

Transportation

Major highways
  U.S. Highway 75
  Iowa Highway 3
  Iowa Highway 12
  Iowa Highway 60
  Iowa Highway 140

Airport
Le Mars Municipal Airport is located in Plymouth County, two nautical miles (3.7 km) southwest of the central business district of Le Mars.

Demographics

2020 census
There were 10,818 housing units, of which 10,171 were occupied.

2010 census
There were 10,550 housing units, of which 9,875 were occupied.

2000 census

As of the census of 2000, there were 24,849 people, 9,372 households, and 6,804 families in the county. The population density was 29 people per square mile (11/km2). There were 9,880 housing units at an average density of 11 per square mile (4/km2). The racial makeup of the county was 98.16% White, 0.29% Black or African American, 0.14% Native American, 0.27% Asian, 0.06% Pacific Islander, 0.46% from other races, and 0.62% from two or more races. 1.32% of the population were Hispanic or Latino of any race.

Of the 9,372 households 35.70% had children under the age of 18 living with them, 63.30% were married couples living together, 6.20% had a female householder with no husband present, and 27.40% were non-families. 24.00% of households were one person and 12.00% were one person aged 65 or older. The average household size was 2.61 and the average family size was 3.12.

The age distribution was 28.30% under the age of 18, 7.20% from 18 to 24, 26.40% from 25 to 44, 22.00% from 45 to 64, and 16.00% 65 or older. The median age was 38 years. For every 100 females there were 98.80 males. For every 100 females age 18 and over, there were 95.70 males.

The median household income was $41,638 and the median family income was $50,009. Males had a median income of $33,566 versus $22,558 for females. The per capita income for the county was $19,442.  About 4.40% of families and 6.00% of the population were below the poverty line, including 6.70% of those under age 18 and 6.40% of those age 65 or over.

Points of interest

Notable people
 William G. Kirchner, Minnesota state legislator and banker
 Ralph Klemme, Iowa state legislator and farmer
 Jim Nicholson, Former Secretary of Veterans Affairs, Republican National Chairman and U.S. Ambassador to the Vatican
 Johnny Niggeling, Major league baseball pitcher
 Paul Rust, actor and comedian
 Thomas Starzl, innovator in organ transplant surgery
 Isaac S. Struble, Congressman (1883–1891) after whom Struble is named
 William Garner Waddel, South Dakota State Senator

Communities

Cities

 Akron
 Brunsville
 Craig
 Hinton
 Kingsley
 Le Mars
 Merrill
 Oyens
 Remsen
 Sioux City (mostly in Woodbury County)
 Struble
 Westfield

Unincorporated communities

 Adaville
 Brookdale
 Crathorne
 Ellendale
 James
 Mammen
 Melbourne
 Millnerville
 Neptune
 O'Leary
 Potosia
 Ruble
 Seney
 Union Center
 West Le Mars
 Wren
 Yeomans

Population ranking
The population ranking of the following table is based on the 2020 census of Plymouth County.

† county seat

Politics
Like most of Northwest Iowa, Plymouth County is a Republican Party stronghold. Lyndon B. Johnson is the last Democrat to win the county in a presidential election, and in elections from 1896 on it has only been won by a Democrat nationally four other times.

Political Subdivisions

 America
 Elgin
 Elkhorn
 Fredonia
 Garfield
 Grant
 Hancock
 Henry
 Hungerford
 Johnson
 Liberty
 Lincoln
 Marion
 Meadow
 Perry
 Plymouth
 Portland
 Preston
 Remsen
 Sioux
 Stanton
 Union
 Washington
 Westfield

See also

Plymouth County Courthouse
National Register of Historic Places listings in Plymouth County, Iowa
Plymouth Roller Milling Company
Damnation (TV series)

References

External links

Plymouth County Iowa Official website

 
1851 establishments in Iowa
Populated places established in 1851